Guns and Roses  is a Philippine action drama romance series that aired on ABS-CBN from June 6 to September 23, 2011, replacing Mara Clara and was replaced by Budoy. starring Robin Padilla, Bea Alonzo and Diether Ocampo.

This is Robin Padilla's second action primetime series in the network, following the television series Basta't Kasama Kita, which concluded eight years ago. This is the first team up with Bea Alonzo as his leading lady and Diether Ocampo in a TV Production. The TV series concluded with a total of 80 episodes.

Series overview

Cast and characters

Main cast
Robin Padilla as Abelardo "Abel" Marasigan. Abel suffers a traumatic childhood when he witnesses his father being framed up by his fellow police officers, leading to his father's mental break down. He vows revenge and he becomes a vigilante who fights for the rights of the hopeless. He wants to try to be part of Don Lucio's endeavors. 
Bea Alonzo as Regina "Reign" Santana. An artist, receives a big blow in her life when her fiancé dies on the day of their wedding after helping out some victims of a hold-up outside the church. From then on she has become a cold, empty shell longing for the love she lost to a violent and unfortunate circumstance. 
Diether Ocampo as Marcus Aguilar. He is the policeman in charge of investigating the death of Reign's fiancé's death. As he gets closer to solving the case, he also could not help but fall for Reign's beauty and charm.
Ejay Falcon as Jonathan "Onat" Marasigan. Onat longs for a father figure in his life after their father was admitted to a mental institution. He finds solace is his older brother Abel but becomes very disappointed in him when he suddenly leaves their family.
Empress Schuck as Joanne "Joni" Dela Rocha. A sweet girl who will melt Onat's hardened heart. She believes in happy ever afters and the innate goodness of every person. She is bubbly and charming but can be a bit stubborn at times.

Supporting cast
Gladys Reyes as Diana Montano Alvaro 
Pinky Amador as Aretha Aguilar
Liza Lorena as Dolor Marasigan/Delta
Mark Gil as Don Lucio Dela Rocha/Señor
Maliksi Morales as Prince Santana
Nanding Josef as Jose 'Pepe' Marasigan
Isabel Rivas as Patricia 'Patria' Santana
Ketchup Eusebio as MacArthur 'Mac-Mac' Pangan
Pen Medina as Philip 'Tsong' Marasigan
Justin Cuyugan as King Santana
Minnie Aguilar as Yayey
Boom Labrusca as Franco Moreno
Ina Feleo as Diana 'Dindin' Ventura
Ian Galliguez as Axl Navarro

Guest cast
Froilan Sales as Zabala
Bernard Laxa as Paltik
Lauren Novero as Russell
Roy Alvarez as Arnulfo
Hiyasmin Neri as Kitchie
Allan Paule as Dante
Crispin Pineda as Badong
Janus Del Prado as Vincent Bartolome
Archie Adamos as Ybanez Ramirez
Levi Ignacio as Melvin Buendia/Marvin Intalan
Lito Pimentel as Rico Bartolome
Angel Jacob as Cristina Dela Rocha
Chinggoy Alonzo as Don Soliven
Joonee Gamboa as Father Fabian

Special participation
John Wayne Sace as Teen Abel
Jairus Aquino as Young Abel
Mika Dela Cruz as Young Reign
Nash Aguas as Teen Marcus
Phytos Ramirez as Young King
William Lorenzo as Young Pepe
Gilleth Sandico as Young Dolor
Farrah Florer as Young Patria
Paolo Rivero as Young Philip
Neri Naig as Young Marlen
Manuel Chua as Young Marvin
Jose Sarasola as Young Rico
Simon Ibarra as Young Badong
Tom Rodriguez as Young Lucio
Jake Cuenca as Paolo Ventura - Regin's fiancé brother of Dindin Ventura
 Mark Sarayot as Teen Jonathan Onat Marasigan

Remake
Hindi television serial Rang Rasiya was inspired from Guns and Roses which debuted on Indian channel Colours on December 30, 2013.

Theme song
The theme song entitled Dahil Mahal Kita was originally performed by The Boyfriends and also covered by Ogie Alcasid.

See also
List of programs broadcast by ABS-CBN
List of ABS-CBN original drama series

References

External links

 

ABS-CBN drama series
Television series by Star Creatives
2011 Philippine television series debuts
2011 Philippine television series endings
Philippine action television series
Philippine romance television series
Filipino-language television shows
Television shows set in the Philippines